Saldaña is a town and municipality in the Tolima department of Colombia.  Saldaña is where nearly 30% of Colombian rice is grown, and most of them work in the rice business.  The population of the municipality was 14,273 as of the 1993 census.

References

Municipalities of Tolima Department